The 1938 European Rowing Championships were rowing championships for men held in the Italian city of Milan. The venue was the Idroscalo, an artificial lake that had been opened as a seaplane airport in 1930. The rowers competed in all seven Olympic boat classes (M1x, M2x, M2-, M2+, M4-, M4+, M8+).

Medal summary

References

1938
European Championships
Rowing,European Championships,1938
Rowing,European Championships
Rowing, European Championships
European Championships,1938
Rowing,European Championships,1938